An SD7 is a 6-axle diesel locomotive built by General Motors Electro-Motive Division between May 1951 and November 1953. It had an EMD 567B 16-cylinder engine producing  for its six traction motors. 188 were built for United States railroads.

This was the first model in EMD's SD (Special Duty) series of locomotives, a lengthened B-B GP7 with a C-C truck arrangement. The two extra axles and traction motors are useful in heavy, low speed freight service. EMD continues to produce SD series locomotives to this day.

Some SD7s both high and short-hood can still be found in service today on shortline railroads and industrial operators, although most Class 1 roads stopped using these locomotives by the 1970s and 1980s.

Design and Production 
The SD7 was conceived as a modification of the existing EMD GP7 with two additional powered axles, one for each truck. Providing two more axles served two purposes: it gave the locomotive more tractive effort compared to the four axle GP7, and distributed the locomotive's weight more evenly.

EMD produced its first examples of the SD7 in May 1951, using the 567B engine. Starting in August 1953 a total of 26 SD7s were produced which used either the 567BC engine or the 567C engine. 

SD7s were originally set up to run long hood forward, usually noted by the letter "F" painted adjacent to the top step of the long hood boarding steps. Many were later changed or upgraded to run short hood forward as is today's Association of American Railroads standard.

EMD ended production in November 1953, and began producing the SD7's successor, the SD9, in January 1954.

Original buyers

Preservation 

The first SD7 (later converted into an SD7R) built by EMD, Southern Pacific 1518 (demonstrator #990), is preserved in operational condition at the Illinois Railway Museum.
Southern 197 is preserved at the Virginia Museum of Transportation. It was originally built as Central of Georgia 201.
The Dakota Southern Railway rosters two SD7's, #512, and #522 (512 and 522 are ex-MILW #2212 and #2222).
Burlington Northern #6008, one of the first 20 SD7s to be built in 1952, is preserved and in restoration to its original appearance as Great Northern #558 at the Minnesota Transportation Museum.
Former Pennsylvania Railroad 8589 is in operation at Red Trail Energy in Richardton, ND, as 1751 with a chopped nose.
Nevada Northern Railway 401 is in service at one of LADWP’s power plants in Delta, Utah. When retired, it will be donated to the Nevada Northern Railway Museum, as part of an agreement.
Portland and Western still rosters SD7 1501 (Ex-SP 5280) in Albany, OR, as of January 2022. 1501 retains its scarlet and gray paint and functional oscillating gyralite.

References 

 
 
 Sarberenyi, Robert. EMD SD7 Original Owners. Retrieved on August 27, 2006
 Diesel Era Volume 6 Number 6 November/December 1995, "EMD's SD7" by Paul K. Withers pp 5-20; 47-50.

External links 
 Locomotive Truck EMD FlexiCoil C

SD07
C-C locomotives
Diesel-electric locomotives of the United States
Railway locomotives introduced in 1952
Freight locomotives
Standard gauge locomotives of the United States